Edward A. Snow is an American poet and translator.

Life
He graduated from Rice University, University of California, Riverside, and State University of New York at Buffalo, in 1969 with a Ph.D.

He is a professor of English at Rice University, and lives in Houston, Texas.

Awards
 1985 Harold Morton Landon Translation Award
 Academy of Arts and Letters Award for the body of his Rilke translations
 1997 PEN Award for Poetry in Translation

Bibliography

Translations

Non-fiction
 A Priest to the Temple: Or The Country Parson, his Character and Rule of Life (1952)
 
  (revised and expanded, 1994)

Reviews
“Though Freedman's biography may muffle Rilke's voice, it comes through like a ringing glass in Uncollected Poems, translated by Edward Snow, who over the years has given readers without German award-winning versions of The Book of Images (1905) and New Poems (1907-1908).  Snow is, with Stephen Mitchell and David Young, among the most trustworthy and exhilarating of Rilke's contemporary translators.”

References

Year of birth missing (living people)
Living people
American male poets
Rice University alumni
University of California, Riverside alumni
University at Buffalo alumni
Rice University faculty
German–English translators